Lake Ūkojas is a lake in the Ignalina district, eastern Lithuania. The lake connects with Lake Alksnaitis and Lake Pakasas.

References 

Ukojas
Ignalina District Municipality